Sa Re Ga Ma Pa L'il Champs, is a  sub-series of Sa Re Ga Ma Pa, it is a singing competition television series, which airs on Zee TV. Young children participate in this show and are judged on the basis of their voice quality, singing talent and versatility in their performance.

In 2021, Sa Re Ga Ma Pa Li’l Champs Nepal was organized.

Series history 
The first season was first aired on 8 July 2006. It was hosted by playback singer Shaan and judged by Abhijeet Bhattacharya, Alka Yagnik and Bappi Lahiri. Sanchita Bhattacharya became the winner of the first season.

See also
 Sa Re Ga Ma Pa Marathi L'il Champs
 Sa Re Ga Ma Pa

References

External links
 Official website

2006 Indian television series debuts
Hindi-language television shows
Television shows set in Mumbai
Zee TV original programming
Sa Re Ga Ma Pa
Reality television spin-offs
Television series about children